Little Elm is a city in Denton County, Texas, United States, and a part of the Dallas–Fort Worth metroplex. It is an extended suburb of Denton; its population was 46,453 as of the 2020 census. In 2000, the census population was at 3,646. By the 2010 census, the city total had jumped to 25,898, making Little Elm one of the fastest-growing municipalities by percentage in Texas since 2000.

History
Little Elm was established along Lewisville Lake by C.C. "Kit" King, son of John and Delilah King, in 1844.  King named the community after the creek banks where it was located.  King helped organize mail service for the area and in 1852 was named the postmaster of Denton County's first post office.  The population was very low throughout the first half of the 20th century but in 1966 was able to officially incorporate.  The first official census for the town came in 1970 which recorded 363 persons. 

On the second of March 2023, a very powerful storm came through north Texas.  It caused damages across the area but most notably, a supermarket's facade was completely torn off covering several automobiles parked in the parking lot.

Geography

Little Elm is generally located along the northern and eastern shores of Lewisville Lake at the crossroads of Eldorado Parkway, FM 720, and FM 423, and includes stretches of U.S. Highway 380.  Its neighbors include Frisco to the east, The Colony and Hackberry to the south, Prosper, Aubrey, Savannah, and Providence to the north, and Oak Point, Cross Roads, Hickory Creek, Lake Dallas, and Lakewood Village to the west.

The city is about 33 miles north of the City of Dallas, 53 miles north of the City of Fort Worth, 23 miles north of Dallas/Fort Worth International Airport, and 20 miles east of the City of Denton, the county seat of Denton County.

Little Elm is located at  (33.163955, –96.930281). Little Elm has an average elevation of 545 feet above sea level.

Demographics

Note: the US Census treats Hispanic/Latino as an ethnic category. This table excludes Latinos from the racial categories and assigns them to a separate category. Hispanics/Latinos can be of any race.

Little Elm's Census population, as of April 1, 2020, was 46,453. Little Elm's build-out population is anticipated to be about 90,000.

Government

Politics
Historically a Republican voting town, it has become more competitive in statewide and national elections as its population has diversified and grown in size, shifting toward the Democratic Party in more recent elections.

Local government 
Little Elm became a home rule municipality in 2001.  It has a council-manager form of government. The town council consists of a mayor and five city council members, one of whom is elected at-large.

The city holds annual municipal elections in March, and run-off elections when necessary in June. Terms for both the offices of the mayor and council are three years, with term limits of three years.

The city has a number of extraterritorial jurisdictions that also vote in municipal elections.

In June 2021, Little Elm elected its first African American mayor, Curtis Cornelious, who previously served two and a half terms on town council as the at-large council member before resigning to run for mayor.

State government 
After the 2021 state and federal redistricting, the town of Little Elm is located almost wholly within Texas State House of Representatives district 57, with tiny portions in district 106. Likewise, most of Little Elm is in Texas State Senate district 12, with some small portions in district 30.

Federal government
Following the 2021 state and federal redistricting, the town of Little Elm is located entirely within United States Congressional district 26.

Education

Three school districts serve Little Elm: Little Elm ISD, Frisco ISD, and Denton ISD.  Generally, the U.S. 380 corridor is served by Denton ISD, the FM 423 corridor and east Little Elm by Frisco ISD, and the rest of Little Elm by Little Elm ISD.  in 2020, Little Elm High School was reclassified to a 6A athletic program.

The Little Elm Independent School District serves most of the original parts of Little Elm. Little Elm ISD is one of the fastest-growing in Denton County. The school district finished building its athletic stadium in 2006 located at the intersection of Hart Road and Eldorado Parkway.  The stadium has a seating capacity of 7,500 with great wheelchair accessibility, a newly renovated video board at the north endzone, and a three level state-of-the-art press box. Although the intent is to keep the community a one-high-school town, two new middle schools opened for the 2020-2021 school year. Most of the city in LEISD goes to Walker Middle School, while small portions go to Strike Middle School.

A portion of the city is within the Frisco Independent School District. Robertson Elementary, which is in Little Elm, along with Stafford Middle School serve part of Sunset Pointe and Frisco Ranch; with other schools outside the city also serving small portions of the area. Lone Star High School also serves most of the city that is under Frisco ISD.

During the summer of 2016, Denton ISD completed construction on its fourth comprehensive high school, Braswell High School, located at the southeast corner of Navo Road and U.S. 380, to serve the fast-growing University Drive corridor, which is part of Little Elm. Along with Braswell, other Denton schools serve the northern area of the city. Navo Middle School and Union Park Elementary are located in the city; while Bell Elementary, Paloma Creek Elementary, Providence Elementary, and Rodriguez Middle School serve portions of Little Elm despite being out of the city's boundaries.

Economy 

While Little Elm is often referred to as a "bedroom community,"  five companies/entities in the city employ over 100 people, per the Little Elm EDC  – Little Elm ISD (853), The Town of Little Elm (311), Kroger (191), Lowe's Home Center (178), and Retractable Technologies (146).  The 2019 Retail Trade population was 203,560.  The unemployment rate in Little Elm, pre-Covid-19, was 3.7%.  Little Elm residents work in a variety of sectors, including retail trade (13.9%), finance/insurance (11.6%), professional/scientific/technical services (10.8%), construction (8.6%), and educational services (8.5%).

Awards and honors

The Arbor Day Foundation designated Little Elm a Tree City USA community for its commitment to urban forestry for three straight years (2011–2013).

The Texas Chapter of the American Planning Association honored Little Elm with its Certificate of Achievement for Planning Excellence award for 2007, 2011, 2012, 2013, and 2014.

In 2013, the Cross Timbers Urban Forestry Council presented Little Elm with its Bronze Leaf Award for its commitment to urban forestry initiatives. 

In 2013, Little Elm was named the safest city in Texas by the Federal Bureau of Investigation and the 18th-safest in the nation for cities with a population of 25,000 or higher. In 2016, Little Elm was ranked the 13th safest by the FBI in the state of Texas for towns with a population of 10,000 or higher.

Parks

Little Elm has five major community parks: Little Elm Park, Cottonwood Park, Beard Park, McCord Park, and Union Park. Cottonwood Park, located in the Lakefront district at the southern terminus of Lobo Lane, is home to Cottonwood Creek Marina.

Beard Park is the future home of Little Elm's Farmers Market, which in 2013 was set up in the Hobby Lobby shopping center.

McCord Park is a wooded, 38-acre park including trails, a disc golf course, a fishing dock, and a playground. The disc golf course was designed by John Houck, a world-renowned disc golf course designer.

Through creative planning and zoning, McCord Park was donated to the city and constructed by the developers of the luxury multifamily projects adjacent to it. The total value of the land and park improvements was estimated to be over $5 million, all of which was paid for by the developer.  Vital to the city's master hike and bike trail plan, McCord Park provides an invaluable link from FM 423 to Veteran's Memorial Bridge on Witt Road and eventually westward along Lewisville Lake to the Lakefront district. It also offers a critical connection point into Frisco's trail system, which is part of a regional master trail system, one day ensuring that Little Elm residents could continually travel to Dallas via trail without interruption.

Infrastructure 
Little Elm has access to the rest of the DFW metroplex via several regionally significant thoroughfares. The Dallas North Tollway is a 5-minute drive east of Little Elm, which opens up the greater north Dallas region to residents, including several large employment and shopping hubs.  DFW Airport is about 30 minutes away by car, and Love Field is about 35 minutes by car.

Eldorado Parkway, a six-lane E/W thoroughfare through most of Little Elm, functions as the city’s main street.  Eldorado provides a critical connection to the region by linking U.S. 75 and I-35E, including the Lewisville Lake Toll Bridge.

FM 423  serves as Little Elm's eastern boundary, although it crosses east of FM 423 in several places. This six-lane thoroughfare connects SH 121 in The Colony to the U.S. 380 corridor. The U.S. 380 corridor is in the northern part of Little Elm and provides an invaluable regional connection between two of the four county seats of the Metroplex (McKinney and Denton).

As of late 2021, TxDOT is planning to expand US 380 to a six-lane divided roadway with grade separations at specific intersections, and is currently at a 95% design phase. Other changes include continuous illumination along the corridor with the goal to improve nighttime visibility and safety. The primary goal of this project is to simultaneously improve through-traffic from Denton to McKinney (and vice versa) and to provide easier, safer accessibility to businesses and housing developments on either side of the 380 corridor. As of Feb 1, 2022, the plan is currently on a temporary hold due to budget changes from TxDOT. 

The Lewisville Lake Toll Bridge, a North Texas Tollway Authority project, was opened to the public on August 1, 2009.  The authority also completed the Dallas North Tollway Extension Phase III in September 2007.

Notable people

Politicians
 Curtis Cornelious, current and first African American Mayor of Little Elm
 Lillian Salerno, Texas state Director for USDA Rural Development, and former Deputy Undersecretary for Rural Development, United States Department of Agriculture under the Obama Administration

Athletes
 Cole Beasley, former American football player; previously played for Tampa Bay Buccaneers, Buffalo Bills, and Dallas Cowboys from 2012 to 2022
 R.J. Hampton, American basketball player for the Orlando Magic, previously played for the Denver Nuggets and New Zealand Breakers
 Weston McKennie, American soccer player for Juventus, currently on loan to Leed's, and a starting member of the United States national team

Entertainers, artists, and celebrities
 Marsai Martin, actress, famous for the movie Little and the TV show Black-ish
 Trevante Rhodes, American actor, most known for his roles in Moonlight, The Predator, Bird Box, and The United States vs. Billie Holiday

References

External links
 Town of Little Elm official website
 LittleElm.com, community website
 http://www.city-data.com/city/Little-Elm-Texas.html
 Little Elm Independent School District

Dallas–Fort Worth metroplex
Cities in Denton County, Texas
Cities in Texas